

Waldhere (or Wealdheri; died between 705 and 716) was an early medieval Bishop of London, England.

Waldhere was consecrated in 693. He died between 705 and 716. A letter of his, written about 704 to Archbishop Bertwald of Canterbury still survives, and discusses the tension between King Ine of Wessex and the joint kings of Essex, Sigeheard and Swaefred. The letter has been described by Sir Frank Stenton as 'the first letter known to have been written from one English-man to another'.

Citations

References

External links
 

Bishops of London
8th-century deaths
Year of birth unknown
8th-century English bishops
8th-century Latin writers
8th-century English writers
Latin letter writers